Travenhorst is a municipality in the district of Segeberg, in Schleswig-Holstein, Germany. It ranges from -2°C to 22°C over the course of the year.

References

Municipalities in Schleswig-Holstein
Segeberg